Kobe Bryant in NBA Courtside, sometimes mislabeled as Kobe Bryant's NBA Courtside, is a basketball simulation video game developed by Left Field Productions and published by Nintendo for the Nintendo 64 in 1998. At the time of the game's release, Kobe Bryant was in his second NBA season and at age 19, was the youngest player to have a game named for him. It was followed by a sequel, NBA Courtside 2: Featuring Kobe Bryant, released in 1999.

Gameplay 
Kobe Bryant in NBA Courtside features 5-on-5 gameplay. There are three modes: Pre-Season (Exhibition), Season, and Playoffs. In both Season and Playoffs modes, players have the option to simulate games.

Team rosters reflect the 1997-98 NBA season with two notable omissions: Chicago Bulls superstar Michael Jordan, and Golden State Warriors star Latrell Sprewell. Due to licensing agreements, a fictional player named "Roster Player #98" is used in Jordan's place. Upon the game's release, Sprewell was serving a 68-game suspension from the league due to a 1997 choking incident. Players can also be created and edited in both appearance and abilities.

Development 
Kobe Bryant in NBA Courtside was first announced at the November 1997 Nintendo Space World, though it did not yet have the Kobe Bryant branding and was to be titled simply "NBA Courtside".

Reception 
The game received “generally favorable" reviews according to the review aggregator website GameRankings. GamePro said, "While Courtside isnt' the greatest basketball game ever made, it's the best hoops game currently available for the N64."

The game received a Player's Choice designation after selling one million copies.

The game was a finalist for the Academy of Interactive Arts & Sciences' 1998 "Sports Game of the Year" award, which went to 1080° Snowboarding.

Notes

References

External links 

 Kobe Bryant’s NBA Courtside

1998 video games
Left Field Productions games
NBA Courtside
Nintendo 64 games
Nintendo 64-only games
Nintendo games
Kobe Bryant
Bryant, Kobe
Video games developed in the United States
Bryant, Kobe
Bryant, Kobe
Multiplayer and single-player video games